Oleksandr Batalskyi (born 28 October 1986 in Kyiv, Ukrainian SSR) is a professional Ukrainian football striker who plays for Obolon Kyiv.

Batalskyi is the product of Lokomotyv Kyiv school system. Starting out at first in FC Arsenal Kyiv, later he spent the rest of his career as a player in different clubs of the Ukrainian First League and the Ukrainian Second League.

References

External links
 
 
 

1986 births
Living people
Footballers from Kyiv
Ukrainian footballers
Ukraine under-21 international footballers
Ukrainian expatriate footballers
FC Arsenal Kyiv players
FC Dnister Ovidiopol players
FC Prykarpattia Ivano-Frankivsk (2004) players
FC Zirka Kropyvnytskyi players
FC Helios Kharkiv players
FC Cherkashchyna players
FC Rukh Lviv players
FC Obolon-Brovar Kyiv players
Association football forwards
Ukrainian First League players
Ukrainian Second League players
Erovnuli Liga 2 players
Expatriate footballers in Georgia (country)
Ukrainian expatriate sportspeople in Georgia (country)